Frontiers of Medicine is a peer-reviewed online-only general medical journal published jointly by the Chinese Higher Education Press and Springer Science+Business Media. It was established in 2007 as Frontiers of Medicine in China, obtaining its current name in 2011. The editors-in-chief are S. Chen (Ruijin Hospital), B. Yang (Harbin Medical University), and X. Chen (Tongji Medical College). According to the Journal Citation Reports, the journal has a 2016 impact factor of 1.634.

References

External links

Springer Science+Business Media academic journals
General medical journals
Publications established in 2007
English-language journals
Online-only journals